Hesperophanes is a genus of long-horned beetles in the family Cerambycidae. There are about eight described species in Hesperophanes.

Species
These eight species belong to the genus Hesperophanes:
 Hesperophanes andresi Sama & Rapuzzi, 2006 c g
 Hesperophanes erosus Gahan, 1894 c g
 Hesperophanes heydeni Baeckmann, 1923 c g
 Hesperophanes melonii Fancello & Cillo, 2012 c g
 Hesperophanes pilosus Bodungen, 1908 c g
 Hesperophanes pubescens (Haldeman, 1847) i c g b
 Hesperophanes sericeus (Fabricius, 1787) c g
 Hesperophanes zerbibi Lepesme & Breuning, 1955 c g
Data sources: i = ITIS, c = Catalogue of Life, g = GBIF, b = Bugguide.net

References

Hesperophanini